Urdinarán is a Spanish language surname. Notable people with the name include:
 Antonio Urdinarán (1898–1961), Uruguayan footballer
 Santos Urdinarán (1900–1979), Uruguayan footballer

References 

Spanish-language surnames
Surnames of Uruguayan origin